The Mussolini government was the longest-serving government in the history of united Italy. The Cabinet administered the country from 31 October 1922 to 25 July 1943, for a total of 7,572 days, or 20 years, 8 months and 25 days.

On taking office, the government was composed by members from National Fascist Party, Italian People's Party, Social Democracy, Italian Liberal Party, Italian Nationalist Association and other independent politicians. However, since 1 July 1924, all other parties were purged and the government was composed exclusively of Fascists, except for a few military officers.

The government fell following the approval of the Grandi agenda by the Grand Council of Fascism on 25 July 1943.

Investiture vote
On October 29, 1922 Benito Mussolini was commissioned by King Victor Emmanuel III to form a new government after leading the March on Rome. The government obtained confidence in the Chamber of Deputies on November 17, 1922, with 306 votes in favor, 116 against and 7 abstentions. On 29 November he obtained the confidence in the Senate of the Kingdom with 196 votes in favor and 19 against.

Government parties

From 1922 to 1924 

From its beginnings until 1924, the government was composed by the following parties:

From 1924 to 1943 
Until July 1, 1924 the government was made up of fascist, popular, liberal and nationalist exponents. From 1924 to 1943, with the transformation of Italy into a one-party totalitarian dictatorship, the government was composed only by members of the National Fascist Party.

Composition

References

 
Government of Italy
Italian governments
1922 establishments in Italy
1943 disestablishments in Italy
Cabinets established in 1922
Cabinets disestablished in 1943